Carex fraseriana is a perennial member of the sedge family with the common name Fraser's sedge. It was the only species of the genus Cymophyllus before it was re-transferred to Carex.

Carex fraseriana is native to the Great Smoky Mountains and southern Appalachian region of the southeastern United States. It is endangered in Pennsylvania, Kentucky, Maryland and Georgia.

References

External links 
 USDA Plants profile for Cymophyllus fraseriana

Cyperaceae
Monotypic Cyperaceae genera
Endemic flora of the United States
Flora of the Appalachian Mountains
Flora of the Southeastern United States
Taxa named by Kenneth Kent Mackenzie